In enzymology, an acylagmatine amidase is an enzyme that catalyzes the chemical reaction

benzoylagmatine + H2O  benzoate + agmatine

Thus, the two substrates of this enzyme are benzoylagmatine and H2O, whereas its two products are benzoate and agmatine.

This enzyme belongs to the family of hydrolases, those acting on carbon-nitrogen bonds other than peptide bonds, specifically in linear amides.  The systematic name of this enzyme class is benzoylagmatine amidohydrolase. Other names in common use include acylagmatine amidohydrolase, and acylagmatine deacylase.

References 

 

EC 3.5.1
Enzymes of unknown structure